Mitrogona is a genus of moths belonging to the family Tineidae.

Species
Mitrogona laevis Meyrick, 1920 (from Kenya)

References

Hieroxestinae
Tineidae genera